Rudy Holmes (born July 19, 1952) is a former American football defensive back. He played for the Atlanta Falcons in 1974 and for the Southern California Sun in 1975.

References

1952 births
Living people
American football defensive backs
Drake Bulldogs football players
Atlanta Falcons players
Southern California Sun players